Nathan Sheron (born 4 October 1997) is an English professional footballer who plays as a defender for Oldham Athletic.

Career
Having previously played for Liverpool at youth level, Sheron began his career with Fleetwood Town, spending time on loan at Chorley, Chester and Southport.

He made his senior debut for Fleetwood on 8 November 2017, in an EFL Trophy match against Carlisle United. In doing so he became the first graduate of Fleetwood's Academy to play for the first-team. He was offered a new contract by Fleetwood at the end of the 2017–18 season. He made his full league debut on 2 October 2018 against Wycombe Wanderers, and was praised by manager Joey Barton.

He moved on loan to Walsall in January 2020.

On 7 July 2020, Sheron joined Scottish Premiership club St Mirren for the 2020–21 season.

At the end of the 2020–21 season, he was released by Fleetwood Town. He joined Harrogate Town on 16 July 2021.

On 29 June 2022, Sheron agreed to join Oldham Athletic on a two-year contract, following the expiry of his Harrogate contract.

Career statistics

Personal life

Sheron is the nephew of former footballer Mike Sheron.

References

1997 births
Living people
English footballers
Association football defenders
Liverpool F.C. players
Fleetwood Town F.C. players
Chorley F.C. players
Chester F.C. players
Southport F.C. players
Walsall F.C. players
St Mirren F.C. players
Harrogate Town A.F.C. players
Oldham Athletic A.F.C. players
English Football League players
Scottish Professional Football League players